The taxon Epidendrum aloifolium refers to:
Epidendrum aloifolium Bateman (1842), a synonym of Epidendrum parkinsonianum
Epidendrum aloifolium L. (1753), a synonym of Cymbidium aloifolium